Dermot St. John Gogarty, RIAI, RIBA, (1908-1985) was  a well-known Irish architect of Dublin and Galway active throughout mid-twentieth-century Ireland. He was the second son of Oliver St John Gogarty.

Dermot St. John Michael Gogarty was born to Oliver St. John Gogarty and Martha Gogarty (née Duane) in Dublin in September 1908. He was educated at Downside School and Pembroke College, Cambridge. He apprenticed under Sir Edwin Landseer Lutyens (1869–1944), and worked for Vincent Kelly. He established his practice in Dublin in 1936, and then moved to Galway in 1948. Gogarty had a keen interest in rowing throughout this life, stemming from his university days. In 1935, he married Carmel Esmonde, daughter of the late Irish nationalist MP John Esmonde, from whom he later divorced. He died in Derby, England in 1985.

References

1908 births
Year of death missing
Architects from Dublin (city)
Alumni of Pembroke College, Cambridge